Camphill may refer to:

The 20th-century Camphill Movement social change initiative
The Woolton Woods and Camp Hill park in Liverpool, England, sometimes written "Camphill"
 Camphill Queen's Park Baptist Church, church in Glasgow, Scotland
 Camphill, Derbyshire, an area of Great Hucklow